Euphaedra wojtusiaki, or Wojtusiak's Ceres forester, is a butterfly in the family Nymphalidae. It is found in eastern Nigeria. The habitat consists of forests.

References

Butterflies described in 1993
wojtusiaki
Endemic fauna of Nigeria
Butterflies of Africa